Dhaka is the capital  of Bangladesh.

Dhaka may also refer to:

Places

Bangladesh
 Dhaka District, a district of Bangladesh
 Dhaka Division, a division of Bangladesh
 Old Dhaka, the historic old city
 Greater Dhaka, the megacity of Dhaka and its surroundings
 Dhaka City Corporation, the former municipal corporation of Dhaka
 Dhaka North City Corporation, a municipal corporation of Dhaka
 Dhaka South City Corporation, a municipal corporation of Dhaka

Pakistan
 Ghora Dhaka, a mountain resort town
 Kala Dhaka, another name for Torghar District in Khyber Pakhtunkhwa province 
 Sra Dhaka,  a village in the Balochistan province

India
 Dhaka (Vidhan Sabha constituency) in Bihar
 Dhaka (village), in North Western Delhi
 Dhaka, East Champaran, a town and a notified area in Bihar

Other
 Dhaka fabric, traditional hand made fabric of Nepal
 Dhaka (film)
 Dhaka railway station

See also
 Daka (disambiguation)
 Dakar (disambiguation)
 Dakka (disambiguation)
 Dakkah, a kind of external settee attached to a house